Stanisław Eleszkiewicz (1900–1963) was a Polish painter and draftsman.

Eleszkievicz was born in Ukraine and raised in Warsaw. In 1912, he attended the School of Fine Arts in Mirgorod.  In 1918, the enlisted in the Poltaw cavalry branch. In 1923, after living in Russia, Athens and Naples, he moved to Paris. From 1927 until 1945, he worked with the famous stained glass designer Jean Gaudin.

References 

1900 births
1963 deaths
Polish painters
Polish male painters